Edward or Ted Rogers may refer to:

Edward Rogers (MP), English Member of Parliament for Kingston upon Hull, 1545
Edward Rogers (died 1627), English MP for Minehead, 1584
Sir Edward Rogers (comptroller) (c. 1498–1568), Comptroller and Vice-Chamberlain of the Household to Elizabeth I of England
Edward Rogers (composer), American musician and composer for film, television and videogames
Edward S. Rogers Sr. (1900–1939), Canadian radio pioneer and businessman
Edward S. Rogers Jr. (1933–2008), Canadian business magnate, founder of Rogers Communications, son of Edward S. Rogers Sr.
Edward S. Rogers III (born 1969), Canadian businessman, chairman of Rogers Communications, son of Edward S. Rogers Jr.
 Edward Rogers (Methodist) (1909–1997), President of the Methodist Church of Great Britain in 1960
Edward Rogers (representative) (1787–1857), American politician, U.S. Representative from New York
Ed Rogers (born 1978), Dominican baseball player in Major League Baseball
Eddie Rogers (1876–1971), American football player
Ted Rogers (comedian) (1933–2001), English comedian and host of 3-2-1
Ted Rogers (Doctor Who), character in the Doctor Who series The Tomb of the Cybermen played by Alan Johns